Marmorino Veneziano is a type of plaster or stucco. It is based on calcium oxide and used for interior and exterior wall decorations. Marmorino plaster can be finished via multiple techniques for a variety of matte, satin, and glossy final effects. It was used as far back as Roman times, but was made popular once more during the Renaissance 500 years ago in Venice.

Marmorino is made from crushed marble and lime putty, which can be tinted to give a wide range of colours. This can then be applied to make many textures, from polished marble to natural stone effects. Widely used in Italy, its appeal has spread through North America especially, but now worldwide. Because of the hours of workmanship, the pricing places it in the high-end market. However, many examples can be seen in public buildings, bars, restaurants, etc.

Its waterproofing and antibacterial qualities as well as visual effects have also made it very desirable for luxury bathrooms, honeymoon bedrooms and other wet areas. Not confined to interior use, it can be seen on the exterior of many buildings to great effect.

History
Marmorino is well known as a classic Venetian plaster; however, its origins are much older, dating to ancient Roman times. We can see evidence of it today in the villas of Pompeii and in various ancient Roman structures. In addition, it was also written about in Vitruvius's De architectura, a 1st Century B.C. history of Rome. Marmorino was rediscovered centuries later after the discovery of Vitruvio's ancient treatise in the 15th century. This 'new' plaster conformed well to the aesthetic requirements dictated by the classical ideal that in the 15th century had recently become fashionable in the Venetian lagoon area.

The first record of work being done with marmorino is a building contract with the nuns of Santa Chiara of Murano in 1473. In this document, it is written that before the marmorino could be applied, the wall had to be prepared with a mortar made of lime and "coccio pesto" (ground terra cotta). This "coccio pesto" was then excavated from tailings of bricks or recycled from old roof tiles.

At this point, to better understand the popularity of marmorino in Venetian life, two facts need to be considered. The first is that in a city that extends over water, the transport of sand for making plaster and the disposal of tailings was, and still is, a huge problem. So the use of marmorino was successful not only because the substrate was prepared using terra cotta scraps, but also the finish, marmorino, was made with leftover stone and marble, which were in great abundance at that time. These ground discards were mixed with lime to create marmorino.

Besides, marmorino and substrates made of "coccio pesto" resisted the ambient dampness of the lagoon better than almost any other plaster. The first because it is extremely breathable by virtue of the kind of lime used (only lime which sets on exposure to air after losing excess water) and the second, because it contains terracotta which when added to lime makes the mixture hydraulic, that is, it's effective even in very damp conditions (because it contains silica and aluminium, bases of modern cement and Hydraulic lime preparations). The second consideration is that an aesthetically pleasing result could be achieved in an era dominated by the return of a classical Greco-Roman style allowing less weight to be transmitted to the foundation when compared to the habit of covering facades with slabs of stone.

Usually, marmorino was white to imitate Istrian stone, which was most often used in Venetian construction, but was occasionally decorated with frescoes to imitate the marble, which Venetian merchants brought home from their voyages to the Orient. (In this period of the Republic of Venice, merchants felt obliged to return home bearing precious, exotic marble as a tribute to the beauty of their own city.)

Marmorino maintained its prestige for centuries until the end of the 1800s when interest in it faded and it was considered only an economical solution to the use of marble. Only at the end of the 1970s, thanks in part to architect Carlo Scarpa's use of marmorino, did this finishing technique return to the interest of the best modern architects.

For about 10 years, industries were also interested in marmorino which was only produced by artisans. Today, however, ready-to-use marmorino can be found, often with glue added to allow it to be applied on non-traditional surfaces such as drywall or wood panelling.

See also
 Scagliola
 Stucco

References

Giovanni Polistena, History of Marmorino, Stucco Italiano, 2012.

External links
 Why Lime? History & Benefits
Wall & Furniture Films

Building materials
Craft materials
Wallcoverings
Plastering